The Kent Theater was located on 167th street between the Grand Concourse and Sheridan Avenue in the Concourse section of The Bronx. It was opened in the 1930s and closed early 1990s. Terminator 2: Judgment Day was the last show at the theater before it was converted to a 99 cent store.

References

 Kent Theater - Bronx (Cinema Treasures)
 THAT’S SHOWBIZ. A SELECTION OF ANCIENT BRONX THEATRES (Forgotten New York; July 3, 2000)

Theatres in the Bronx